In particle physics, NMSSM is an acronym for Next-to-Minimal Supersymmetric Standard Model.
 It is a supersymmetric extension to the Standard Model that adds an additional singlet chiral superfield to the  MSSM and can be used to dynamically generate the  term, solving the -problem. Articles about the NMSSM are available for review.

The Minimal Supersymmetric Standard Model does not explain why the  parameter in the superpotential term  is at the electroweak scale. The idea behind the Next-to-Minimal Supersymmetric Standard Model is to promote  the  term to a gauge singlet, chiral superfield . The superpotential for the NMSSM is given by

where  gives the Yukawa couplings for the Standard Model fermions. The role of the  term is to generate an effective  term.
 
Without the  term the superpotential would have a U(1)' symmetry, so-called Peccei–Quinn symmetry; see Peccei–Quinn theory. This additional symmetry would alter the phenomenology completely. The role of the  term is to break this U(1)' symmetry. The  term is introduced trilinearly such that  is dimensionless. However, there remains a discrete  symmetry, which is moreover broken spontaneously. In principle this leads to the domain wall problem. Introducing additional but suppressed terms, the  symmetry can be broken without changing phenomenology at the electroweak scale.
It is assumed that the domain wall problem is circumvented in this way without any modifications except far beyond the electroweak scale.

Other models have been proposed which solve the -problem of the MSSM. One idea is to keep the  term in the superpotential and take the U(1)' symmetry into account. Assuming this symmetry to be local, an additional,  gauge boson is predicted in this model, called the UMSSM.

Phenomenology 
Due to the additional singlet , the NMSSM alters in general the phenomenology of both the Higgs sector and the neutralino sector compared with the MSSM.

Higgs phenomenology 
In the Standard Model we have one physical Higgs boson. In the MSSM we encounter five physical Higgs bosons. Due to the additional singlet  in the NMSSM we have two more Higgs bosons; that is, in total seven physical Higgs bosons. Its Higgs sector is therefore much richer than that of the MSSM. In particular, the Higgs potential is in general no longer invariant under CP transformations; see CP violation. In the special case of a CP-conserving Higgs potential we have three CP even Higgs bosons, two CP odd ones, and a pair of charged Higgs bosons, . In the MSSM, the lightest Higgs boson is always Standard Model-like, and therefore its production and decays are roughly known. In the NMSSM, the lightest Higgs can be very light (even of the order of 1 GeV), and thus may have escaped detection so far. In addition, in the CP-conserving case, the lightest CP even Higgs boson turns out to have an enhanced lower bound compared with the MSSM. This is one of the reasons why the NMSSM has been the focus of much attention in recent years.

Neutralino phenomenology 
The spin-1/2 singlino  gives a fifth neutralino, compared with the four neutralinos of the MSSM. The singlino does not couple with any gauge bosons, gauginos (the superpartners of the gauge bosons), leptons, sleptons (the superpartners of the leptons), quarks or squarks (the superpartners of the quarks). Suppose that a supersymmetric partner particle is produced at a collider, for instance at the LHC, the singlino is omitted in cascade decays and therefore escapes detection. However, if the singlino is the lightest supersymmetric particle (LSP), all supersymmetric partner particles eventually decay into the singlino. Due to R parity conservation this LSP is stable. In this way the singlino could be detected via missing transverse energy in a detector.

References 

Physics beyond the Standard Model
Supersymmetric quantum field theory